Frank Rosenblatt (July 11, 1928July 11, 1971) was an American psychologist notable in the field of artificial intelligence. He is sometimes called the father of deep learning.

Life and career
Rosenblatt was born into a Jewish family New Rochelle, New York as the son of Dr. Frank and Katherine Rosenblatt.

After graduating from The Bronx High School of Science in 1946, he attended Cornell University, where he obtained his A.B. in 1950 and his Ph.D. in 1956.

He then went to Cornell Aeronautical Laboratory in Buffalo, New York, where he was successively a research psychologist, senior psychologist, and head of the cognitive systems section. This is also where he conducted the early work on perceptrons, which culminated in the development and hardware construction of the Mark I Perceptron in 1960. This was essentially the first computer that could learn new skills by trial and error, using a type of neural network that simulates human thought processes.

Rosenblatt's research interests were exceptionally broad. In 1959 he went to Cornell's Ithaca campus as director of the Cognitive Systems Research Program and also as a lecturer in the Psychology Department. In 1966 he joined the Section of Neurobiology and Behavior within the newly formed Division of Biological Sciences, as associate professor. Also in 1966, he became fascinated with the transfer of learned behavior from trained to naive rats by the injection of brain extracts, a subject on which he would publish extensively in later years. 
 
In 1970 he became field representative for the Graduate Field of Neurobiology and Behavior, and in 1971 he shared the acting chairmanship of the Section of Neurobiology and Behavior. Frank Rosenblatt died in July 1971 on his 43rd birthday, in a boating accident in Chesapeake Bay.

Academic interests

Perceptron

Rosenblatt was best known for the Perceptron, an electronic device which was constructed in accordance with biological principles and showed an ability to learn. Rosenblatt's perceptrons were initially simulated on an IBM 704 computer at Cornell Aeronautical Laboratory in 1957. When a triangle was held before the perceptron's eye, it would pick up the image and convey it along a random succession of lines to the response units, where the image was registered.

He developed and extended this approach in numerous papers and a book called Principles of Neurodynamics: Perceptrons and the Theory of Brain Mechanisms, published by Spartan Books in 1962. He received international recognition for the Perceptron. The New York Times billed it as a revolution, with the headline “New Navy Device Learns By Doing”, and The New Yorker similarly admired the technological advancement.

Research on comparable devices was also being done in other places such as SRI, and many researchers had big expectations on what they could do. The initial excitement became somewhat reduced, though, when in 1969 Marvin Minsky and Seymour Papert published the book “Perceptrons” with a mathematical proof about the limitations of two-layer feed-forward perceptrons as well as unproven claims about the difficulty of training multi-layer perceptrons. The book's only proven result—that linear functions cannot model non-linear ones—was trivial but the book had nevertheless a pronounced effect on research funding and, consequently, the community.

After research on neural networks returned to the mainstream in the 1980s, new researchers started to study Rosenblatt's work again. This new wave of study on neural networks is interpreted by some researchers as being a contradiction of hypotheses presented in the book Perceptrons, and a confirmation of Rosenblatt's expectations.

The Mark I Perceptron, which is generally recognized as a forerunner to artificial intelligence, currently resides in the Smithsonian Institution in Washington D.C. MARK 1 was able to learn, to recognize letters, and could solve quite complex problems.

Rosenblatt's Book

Rosenblatt's book Principles of Neurodynamics: Perceptrons and the Theory of Brain Mechanisms, published by Spartan Books in 1962, summarized his work on perceptrons at the time. The book is divided into four parts. The first gives an historical review of alternative approaches to brain modeling, the physiological and psychological considerations, and the basic definitions and concepts of the perceptron approach. The second covers three-layer series-coupled perceptrons: the mathematical underpinnings, performance results in psychological experiments, and a variety of perceptron variations. The third covers multi-layer and cross-coupled perceptrons, and the fourth back-coupled perceptrons and problems for future study. Rosenblatt used the book to teach an interdisciplinary course entitled "Theory of Brain Mechanisms" that drew students from Cornell's Engineering and Liberal Arts colleges.

Rat brain experiments
Around the late 1960s, Rosenblatt began experiments within the Cornell Department of Entomology on the transfer of learned behavior via rat brain extracts. Rats were taught discrimination tasks such as Y-maze and two-lever Skinner box. Then their brains were extracted and injected into untrained rats that were subsequently tested in the discrimination tasks to determine whether or not there was behavior transfer from the trained to the untrained rats. Rosenblatt spent his last several years on this problem and showed convincingly that the initial reports of larger effects were wrong and that any memory transfer was at most very small.

Other interests

Astronomy

Rosenblatt also had a serious research interest in astronomy and proposed a new technique to detect the presence of stellar satellites. He built an observatory on a hilltop behind his house in Brooktondale about 6 miles east of Ithaca. When construction on the observatory was completed, Rosenblatt began an intensive study on SETI (Search for Extraterrestrial Intelligence).

Politics
Rosenblatt was very active in liberal politics. He worked in the Eugene McCarthy primary campaigns for president in New Hampshire and California in 1968 and in a series of Vietnam protest activities in Washington.

IEEE Frank Rosenblatt Award
The Institute of Electrical and Electronics Engineers (IEEE), the world's largest professional association dedicated to advancing technological innovation and excellence for the benefit of humanity, named its annual award in honor of Frank Rosenblatt.

See also
 Artificial neural network
 History of artificial intelligence
 AI Winter
 Perceptrons

References

1928 births
1971 deaths
Scientists from New Rochelle, New York
20th-century American psychologists
Cornell University alumni
The Bronx High School of Science alumni
Artificial intelligence researchers
Boating accident deaths
Cornell University faculty
Jewish American scientists